The 1950 Penn Quakers football team was an American football team that represented the University of Pennsylvania as an independent during the 1950 college football season. In its 13th season under head coach George Munger, the team compiled a 6–3 record and outscored opponents by a total of 223 to 95. The team played its home games at Franklin Field in Philadelphia.

Schedule

References

Penn
Penn Quakers football seasons
Penn Quakers football